The Papuan babbler (Garritornis isidorei), New Guinea babbler or Isidore's rufous babbler, is a species of bird in the family Pomatostomidae.
It is found in New Guinea.
Its natural habitat is subtropical or tropical moist lowland forests.

References
 BirdLife International 2004.  Pomatostomus isidorei.   2006 IUCN Red List of Threatened Species.   Downloaded on 26 July 2007.

Papuan babbler
Birds of New Guinea
Endemic fauna of New Guinea
Least concern biota of Oceania
Papuan babbler
Taxonomy articles created by Polbot